Junior Sewanu Lokosa (born 23 August 1993) is a Nigerian footballer who plays for Al-Rayyan.

Career
Lokosa played for First Bank before moving to Kano Pillars in May 2017. He scored five goals in 14 league games up to the end of the 2017 season.

By the midway point of the 2018 season, Lokosa had scored 14 goal in 15 matches. In May 2018, he went on trial with Bulgarian club Ludogorets, and he also had a trial at Norwegian club Brann. At the end of the season, he received the Eunisell Boot Award after his 19 goals placed him top of the NPFL scoring charts, earning him N3.8million (N200,000 for each goal).

After trials in China, he joined Espérance Sportive de Tunis on 14 January 2019, signing a two-and-a-half-year contract. On July 30, 2020 the Tunisian champions Espérance Sportive de Tunis announced Lokosa’s departure on their Official Twitter and cut his contract.

On 5 August 2022, Lokosa joined Saudi Second Division side Al-Rayyan.

International career
Lokosa made his international debut for Nigeria on 28 May 2018 in a friendly against DR Congo. After his impressive form with Kano Pillars, Lokosa was named in the 30-man provisional squad for the 2018 FIFA World Cup in Russia. However, he did not make the final 23.

Career statistics

Club

International

References

External links

1993 births
Living people
Sportspeople from Lagos State
Nigerian footballers
Nigerian expatriate footballers
Association football forwards
First Bank F.C. players
Kano Pillars F.C. players
Espérance Sportive de Tunis players
Al-Rayyan Club (Saudi Arabia) players
Nigeria Professional Football League players
Saudi Second Division players
Nigeria international footballers
Expatriate footballers in Saudi Arabia
[[Category:Nigerian expatriate sportspeople in Saudi Arabia]